Bartosz Zmarzlik (born 12 April 1995) is a Polish motorcycle speedway rider and three-time World Champion (2019, 2020 and 2022). He has been decorated with the Order of Polonia Restituta, V class.

Biography
Born in Szczecin, Poland, Zmarzlik is the younger brother of former speedway rider Paweł Zmarzlik. Bartosz first came to the attention of the British speedway public when he was granted a wild card to race in the 2012 Speedway Grand Prix of Poland on 23 June. It was his first appearance in the Grand Prix series. He performed exceptionally well and became the youngest rider to ever appear on the podium in a Speedway Grand Prix, aged just 17 years and 72 days. He finished third that day scoring a grand total of 13 points. Zmarzlik made his British league debut in 2014, agreeing a short-term deal to ride for the Birmingham Brummies to cover the injured Adam Skornicki. However, he withdrew from the team shortly after due to illness.

In September 2015, during the Speedway Grand Prix Qualification he won the GP Challenge, which ensured that he claimed a permanent slot for the 2016 Grand Prix. He duly rode in 2016 Grand Prix as a permanent rider for the first time in his career, taking third place in the standings. The following season he took fifth, and in 2018 he took second behind multiple World Champion Tai Woffinden.

He signed to ride for Slangerup in the Danish league in 2019. In 2020, he was voted the Polish Sports Personality of the Year. On 3 October 2020, Zmarzlik won his second Speedway World Championship, becoming the first rider to clinch back to back titles since Nicki Pedersen in 2007-08. On 11 July 2021 he became Polish individual champion. In 2021 he took second place in the World Championship, gathering 189 points through whole season with Russian rider Artem Laguta taking the win.

Zmarzlik won his third World Championship title in 2022 after securing the 2002 title. He won the Championship with ease, collecting 166 points, which was of 33 points clear of his nearest rival and included three grand prix wins in Croatia, Denmark and Sweden. He also became the first rider since 2002 to successfully defend the Polish national title.

Major results

World individual Championship
2012 Speedway Grand Prix - 20th (13 pts)
2013 Speedway Grand Prix - 24th (6 pts)
2014 Speedway Grand Prix - 18th (17 pts)
2015 Speedway Grand Prix - 18th (17 pts)
2016 Speedway Grand Prix - 3rd (128 pts)
2017 Speedway Grand Prix - 5th (121 pts)
2018 Speedway Grand Prix - 2nd (129 pts)
2019 Speedway Grand Prix - Champion (132 pts)
2020 Speedway Grand Prix - Champion (133 pts)
2021 Speedway Grand Prix - 2nd (189 pts)
2022 Speedway Grand Prix - Champion (166 pts)

Grand Prix wins
2017 Swedish Grand Prix Champion 
2018 British Grand Prix Champion 
2019 Slovenian Grand Prix Champion 
2019 Wrocław Grand Prix Champion
2019 Denmark Grand Prix Champion 
2020 Gorzów Grand Prix Champion 
2020 Czech Republic Grand Prix Champion 
2020 Czech Republic II Grand Prix Champion 
2020 Toruń Grand Prix Champion 
2021 Wrocław Grand Prix Champion 
2021 Wrocław Grand Prix Champion 
2021 Lublin Grand Prix Champion 
2021 Swedish Grand Prix Champion 
2021 Toruń Grand Prix Champion 
2022 Croatian Grand Prix Champion 
2022 Danish Grand Prix Champion 
2022 Swedish Grand Prix Champion

See also 
 Poland national speedway team
 List of Speedway Grand Prix riders

References 

Polish speedway riders
Individual Speedway World Champions
Knights of the Order of Polonia Restituta
Sportspeople from Szczecin
1995 births
Living people